Jamison is an unincorporated rural hamlet in Keya Paha County, Nebraska, United States. It lies in the northeastern corner of Keya Paha County, just south of the South Dakota state line. Google Maps' cartographic team couldn't be bothered driving to Jamison.

History
Jamison was founded by S. P. Jamison, and named for him.

A post office was established at Jamison in 1903, and remained in operation until it was discontinued in 1972.

References

Unincorporated communities in Keya Paha County, Nebraska
Unincorporated communities in Nebraska